The Crowd Roars is a 1938 film starring Robert Taylor as a boxer who gets entangled in the seamier side of the sport. It was remade in 1947 as Killer McCoy, featuring Mickey Rooney in the title role. This film was not a remake of the 1932 film of the same name starring James Cagney. The supporting cast for the 1938 version features Edward Arnold, Frank Morgan, Lionel Stander, and Jane Wyman.

Plot
Tommy McCoy becomes a boxer, not for love of the sport but for the money. He has to put up with his alcoholic, gambling father Brian. Just before his first major fight, Tommy learns that his opponent has been injured and has been replaced at the last minute by Tommy's good friend, former world champion Johnny, trying to make a comeback. During the bout, Tommy kills Johnny and is named "Killer McCoy" in the newspapers. He then comes under the control of powerful bookmaker Jim Cain. 

While training, Tommy meets and falls in love with Cain's daughter Sheila. Cain has been very careful to keep his daughter from learning about his profession. Cain tries to break up their romance, but without success.

Tommy wins fight after fight, becoming a contender. If he wins his next bout, he will get a shot at the world championship title. However, "Pug" Walsh, a traitorous associate of Cain's, has both Sheila and Brian kidnapped. He orders Tommy to lose the fight in the eighth round or else. Tommy has no choice; he endures a merciless pounding for round after round, not even daring to hit his foe for fear a lucky punch could end the match and his loved ones' lives.  Brian pretends to collapse, then manages to grab a gangster's gun. He sends Sheila to the fight, while he holds their two former captors at gunpoint. However, while he is distracted by the radio broadcast of the fight, one of the men shoots him; he fires back, and all three are killed. Sheila arrives just before the start of the eighth round. Tommy proceeds to knock out his opponent, then announces he is giving up boxing. Cain also retires. Afterward, Tommy and Sheila get married.

Cast

 Robert Taylor as Tommy "Killer" McCoy
 Edward Arnold as Jim Cain, aka James W. Carson
 Frank Morgan as Brian McCoy
 Maureen O'Sullivan as Sheila Carson
 William Gargan as Johnny Martin
 Lionel Stander as "Happy" Lane
 Jane Wyman as Vivian
 Nat Pendleton as "Pug" Walsh
 Art Lasky uncredited role as the fighter "McAvoy"
 Charles D. Brown as Bill Thorne
 Gene Reynolds as Tommy McCoy as a boy
 Don "Red" Barry as Pete Mariola
 Donald Douglas as Murray
 Isabel Jewell as Mrs. Martin
 J. Farrell MacDonald as Father Patrick Ryan
 Horace McMahon as Rocky Simpson

Reception
According to MGM records the film earned $1,369,000 in the US and Canada and $663,000 elsewhere, resulting in a profit of $761,000.

References

External links
 
 
 
 

1938 films
1930s sports drama films
American black-and-white films
American boxing films
American sports drama films
Films directed by Richard Thorpe
Metro-Goldwyn-Mayer films
1938 drama films
Films scored by Edward Ward (composer)
1930s English-language films
1930s American films